Asal Shodiyeva (sometimes spelled Asal Shodieva in English) (born April 6, 1992) is an Uzbek film actress and singer.

Asal Shodiyeva started his art career in 2006. Asal Shodiyeva became famous in 2008 through the movie "Janob Xech kim".

Life
Asal Shodiyeva was born on April 6, 1992 in Tashkent.  In 2003-2008, Shodiyeva studied at the V. A. Uspensky Special Music Academic High School. He studied at the Kamoliddin Behzod Institute of Painting and Design at the Faculty of Interior Design.

Personal life
In 2016, Asal Shodiyeva married the singer Shoxrux Yuldashev, known by his nickname Shohruhxon. Currently, they have children named Muhammad Yusuf and Muhammad Amin.

Spouse: Shoxruhxon
Child: Muhammad Yusuf Yuldashev
Child: Baxtiyor Yuldashev
Mother-in-law: Zebo Navro’zva

Career
Asal Shodiyeva started her creative career in 2006. She played her debut role in director Ravil Botirov's film "Paradise is the rule". In 2008, Shodiyeva played one of the main characters in the film "Janob Xech kim", this role brought her great fame and increased the demands for Asal's creativity. In 2009, Shodiyeva started acting in several films. Among them: "Poyma-poy" (Incoherent), "Tango or Lost Suitors", "Dangerous Adventure" and "Marriage" deserved great recognition. In 2010, he starred in the films "The Last Note of Autumn", "Eye of the Heart", "Flying Girl". In 2011, "Jigarbandim", in 2012 "Hay-hai girl", "My mother's dream", "Hello love, goodbye", "Angel of love", "Destiny" films. In 2013, he starred in the films "Panjara", "Race", "Angel of Love 2", "Vafodorim", and "Odnoklassniki.ru". In 2014, Asal Ko'yoshim, "Life Without You Is Boring" and "Until My Last Breath" were released. In 2015, Asal started acting in a single film "Uchrashguncha". In 2016, Asal began to work in the series "Artist" directed by Ayub Shakhobiddinov. In addition, Asal acted in the films "Majnun", "Vakhshiy" and "Courageous Lovers". In 2017, Asal gained momentum in the series called "Saodat". In 2018, the historical film Islamkhoja gained momentum. In 2021, he started acting in the series called Kadir Khan.

Filmography

Discography

Music videos

Awards
A new generation, the voice of the future.
State Recognition Award (Etirof)
The best actress of 2014

References

External links

Asal Shodiyeva on Instagram 
Asal Shodiyeva on Telegram

Living people
Uzbekistani film actresses
1992 births
Actors from Tashkent
21st-century Uzbekistani actresses
Musicians from Tashkent